Sabine Englert (born 27 November 1981) is a German team handball goalkeeper, who currently plays in Aarhus United and previously for the German national team. 

She has previously played for the Austrian club Hypo Niederösterreich, Bayer Leverkusen in Germany and 13 seasons for Herning-Ikast Håndbold.

International career
Englert made her debut on the German team in 2001. She received a bronze medal at the 2007 World Championship.

She competed at the 2008 Summer Olympics in Beijing, where Germany finished 11th.

Club career
Englert was Austrian champion with Hypo Niederösterreich in 2008.

Individual awards
All-Star Goalkeeper of the Danish League: 2019

References

External links

1981 births
Living people
People from Aschaffenburg
Sportspeople from Lower Franconia
German female handball players
Olympic handball players of Germany
Handball players at the 2008 Summer Olympics
Expatriate handball players
German expatriate sportspeople in Austria
German expatriate sportspeople in Denmark